Echo Bay is a resort village in the Canadian province of Saskatchewan within Census Division No. 16. It is on the shores of Big Shell Lake in the Rural Municipality of Spiritwood No. 496.

History 
Echo Bay incorporated as a resort village on August 1, 1982.

Demographics 

Government 
The Resort Village of Echo Bay is governed by an elected municipal council and an appointed administrator that meets on the second Saturday of every month. The mayor is Joe Tindall and its administrator is Tara Bueckert.

See also 
List of communities in Saskatchewan
List of municipalities in Saskatchewan
List of resort villages in Saskatchewan
List of villages in Saskatchewan
List of summer villages in Alberta

References 

Resort villages in Saskatchewan
Spiritwood No. 496, Saskatchewan
Division No. 16, Saskatchewan